Harpy is a steel roller coaster at Xishuangbanna Theme Park in China. The roller coaster opened to the public on September 26, 2015, making it the second late installation of its kind (as of early 2019). Harpy reaches a height of 131 feet (40 m) and speeds up to 52.8 miles per hour (85 km/h).

Experience

Station and loading
Riders first board the train in a similar style to inverted roller coasters. The restraints on this ride are padded vests and a lap bar coming from above. To make the ride more comfortable there are two flaps holding the legs in place during the ride. After the trains is loaded and ready to dispatch, the cars enter the flying position, the train then departs the station.

Ride layout
The ride begins with a 90° turn into the chain lift hill. After climbing this lift hill and descending the first drop, that's curved to the right riders experience a pretzel loop. The track then wraps around one half loop of the pretzel loop and "threads" it. After turning to the right, riders dip down and get very close to water where splash effects simulate parts of the trains touching the water. After a sharp right turn the track leads over the final brake run into an inline twist, followed by a 260° helix. The train then hits the final brake run.

Roller coasters in China
Flying roller coasters manufactured by Bolliger & Mabillard